The Philippine House Committee on Mindanao Affairs, or House Mindanao Affairs Committee is a standing committee of the Philippine House of Representatives.

Jurisdiction 
As prescribed by House Rules, the committee's jurisdiction is on Mindanao's development which includes the preparation of a comprehensive and integrated development plan for the said island group.

Members, 18th Congress

See also
 House of Representatives of the Philippines
 List of Philippine House of Representatives committees

References

External links 
House of Representatives of the Philippines

Mindanao Affairs
Mindanao